John Freeman Loutit CBE FRS FRCP (19 February 1910 – 11 June 1992), also known as 'Ian', was an Australian haematologist and radiobiologist.

Life 
John Freeman Loutit was born in Western Australia, the son of a locomotive engineer. He moved interstate for his tertiary education, entering residence at Trinity College, Melbourne, in 1929 while studying at the University of Melbourne.

He contributed significantly to the development of improved techniques for the storage and transfusion of blood during the Second World War. After the war he became a leading researcher in the then novel field of radiobiology. He established and ran the Medical Research Council's Radiobiology Unit at Harwell from 1947 to 1969. He gave the 1969 Bradshaw Lecture to the Royal College of Physicians on the subject of malignancies caused by radium.

He was elected a Fellow of the Royal Society in 1963. His candidature citation read:

He died in 1992. He had married Thelma Salusbury in 1941; they had three children.

See also
 Blood bank

References

1910 births
1992 deaths
Australian haematologists
Commanders of the Order of the British Empire
Fellows of the Royal College of Physicians
Fellows of the Royal Society
People from Perth, Western Australia
People educated at Trinity College (University of Melbourne)